Lake Catherine may refer to:

 Lake Catherine (Arkansas), a lake in the US
 Lake Catherine, Illinois, a census-designated place

See also
 Lake Katherine, a lake in New Mexico, US
 Lake Katharine State Nature Preserve, a nature preserve in Jackson County, Ohio, US
 Lake Kathryn (disambiguation)
 Catherine (disambiguation)